Michel De Saedeleer (11 February 1949 – 19 March 2007) was a Belgian field hockey player. He competed in the men's tournament at the 1972 Summer Olympics.

References

External links
 

1949 births
2007 deaths
Belgian male field hockey players
Olympic field hockey players of Belgium
Field hockey players at the 1972 Summer Olympics
People from Etterbeek
Field hockey players from Brussels